Martin Rejthar (born October 13, 1971) is a Czech former professional ice hockey defenceman.

Rejthar played 50 games in the Czech Extraliga for HC Plzeň and HC Karlovy Vary. He also played six seasons for AaB Ishockey in Denmark from 2001 to 2007, playing 183 games for the team.

References

External links

1971 births
Living people
AaB Ishockey players
Czech ice hockey defencemen
HC Karlovy Vary players
HC Plzeň players
Hokej Šumperk 2003 players
HC Tábor players
Czechoslovak ice hockey defencemen
Czech expatriate ice hockey people
Expatriate ice hockey players in Denmark
Czech expatriate sportspeople in Denmark